Vendetta dal futuro (also known as Hands of Steel) is an Italian science fiction film directed by Sergio Martino. The film stars Daniel Greene, George Eastman and John Saxon.

Plot 

An evil industrialist (John Saxon) has created a cyborg (Daniel Greene) who is 70% robot and 30% human. When the cyborg rebels, he ends up working at a bar frequented by arm wrestling enthusiasts. The cyborg just wants to be left alone but he is hounded by Saxon's men, the government, and the arm wrestlers.

Cast 
 Daniel Greene as Paco Queruak
 Janet Agren as Linda
 Claudio Cassinelli as Peter Howell
 John Saxon as Francis Turner
 George Eastman as Raul Morales
 Roberto Bisacco as Cooper
 Pat Monti
 Andrea Coppola as Eddie

Production
Hands of Steel was filmed in Arizona with some scenes shot at the Grand Canyon and the town of Arcosanti. Actor Claudio Cassinelli died in Page, Arizona during production as he was on a helicopter that crashed into the Navajo Bridge.

Style
Howard Hughes noted that the film belongs to a group of Italian film productions that borrowed elements from the film The Terminator, including Bruno Mattei's Shocking Dark and Nello Rossati's Alien Terminator. In his overview of 1980s action films, Daniel R. Budnik described the film as "the hybrid movie to end all hybrid movies", noting The Terminator and Blade Runner as influences, as well as the plot later being borrowed for Over the Top.

Release
Vendetta dal futuro passed Italian censors in 1986. The film has been released with the English titles of Atomic Cyborg and Hands of Steel.

Reception
From retrospective reviews, Hughes described Vendetta dal futuro as "the best example" of a film in debt to The Terminator, noting its other influences of Blade Runner with a karate-fighting android and praising an action sequence featuring lorries, cars and helicopters as well as the score. Budnik found that the film's beginning was boring with its more political elements, but improved after these scenes and that it was "fine, furious desert action with arm wrestling, and some sort of strange cyborg woman thrown in to confuse things."  Donald Guarisco of AllMovie described the film as a "decent time-killer for b-movie fans" noting that its "southwestern setting gives it a unique flavor and Sergio Martino (using the pseudonym of "Martin Dolman") does a decent job of delivering plentiful action on a shoestring budget: his best moment might be a scene where the hero has to fend off gun-toting assassins while also fighting a pair of disguised cyborgs in close quarters." Guarisco concluded that "The end results are frequently silly (it takes the police a really long time to figure out they're hunting a cyborg) but never dull" and declared the film to be "strictly for the b-movie audience but they're likely to enjoy its low-budget fun."

References

Footnotes

Sources

External links
 

1980s science fiction action films
Cyborg films
Italian science fiction action films
Films directed by Sergio Martino
Films set in Arizona
Films set in the future
Films shot in Arizona
Films scored by Claudio Simonetti
Films produced by Luciano Martino
1980s dystopian films
1980s Italian films